Jonny Donahoe is a British comedian, writer and performer. He is one half of the comedy band Jonny and the Baptists, with Paddy Gervers.

Education
Donahoe was educated at Abingdon School from 1996 to 2001.

Career
Donahoe is best known for his comedy band Jonny & the Baptists, a collaboration with Paddy Gervers, who have made several appearances on BBC Radio 4. He has toured internationally with the critically acclaimed Every Brilliant Thing, which he co-wrote with Duncan Macmillan, following a very successful off-Broadway run at the Barrow Street Theatre in New York City. In 2014/15 Donahoe was nominated for the Drama Desk Award for Outstanding Solo Performance and the Lucille Lortel Award for Outstanding Solo Show. Every Brilliant Thing was also filmed and screened on HBO in 2016.

In 2022 Donahoe took a solo show Forgiveness on tour.

See also
 List of Old Abingdonians

References

External links

Jonny and the Baptists on Radio 4's Fresh from the Fringe 2012
Every Brilliant Thing official website

Jonny Donahoe at Internet Off-Broadway Database

1983 births
Living people
English male comedians
English comedy musicians
English comedy writers
People educated at Abingdon School